MangaGamer is a video game publisher specializing in the English localization and distribution of Japanese eroge and visual novels. It is run by Japanese-based company Japan Animation Contents.

History
MangaGamer was originally envisioned as a company that would sell Japanese visual novels overseas by Hiroshi Takeuchi, also known under his alias Bamboo, president of Japanese eroge development company Overdrive. Due to the cost involved, he convinced several other Japanese eroge companies (Tarte, Nexton and Circus) to take part in a joint venture.

Due to this setup, the initial lineup of titles consisted of titles produced by companies involved in MangaGamer's creation, with Navel soon joining with their first title, Shuffle!. These early titles were translated by native Japanese speakers involved with parent companies, which resulted in a subpar quality. 

After complaints from fans, it was announced that a complete re-translation of Edelweiss was in progress. Starting with Soul Link, translation and editing is handled by an international team of native English speakers, resulting in an increased quality. The company itself is headed by a relative of Takeuchi, and a core Japanese staff is spread between the involved Japanese companies.

At their panel at  Otakon 2011, MangaGamer announced that they are expanding their business into digital distribution of erotic manga (by Japanese publisher Akane Shinsha) and anime (by Discovery).

Relations with fan translators
MangaGamer has served as a mediator in talks between several fan translation groups and Japanese game companies that ended in deals made to officially release said translations through MangaGamer. Their games include Kara no Shōjo by Innocent Grey and Ef: A Fairy Tale of the Two. by Minori. MangaGamer also distributed for a time the Japanese versions of several games created by the dōjin circle 07th Expansion (Umineko no Naku Koro ni, Higanbana no Saku Yoru ni, Rose Guns Days) for explicit use of the respective English fan translations.

Distribution
Originally, MangaGamer sold their titles exclusively via digital distribution, and it remains their primary release channel. During the Anime Expo 2010 and Otakon 2010 conventions, physical disks were sold with the first four games in the Higurashi When They Cry series and Kira Kira All-Ages. Those games were later sold by HimeyaShop and Hendane!.com. 

In January 2011, a collaboration  was announced between Hendane!.com and MangaGamer resulting in the sale of physical copies of Da Capo Limited Edition through Hendane!.com. In July 2011, J-List became the primary North American distributor of physical copies for all current MangaGamer titles, except Da Capo LE. Around the same time, MangaGamer opened their own webshop for physical copies aimed at European customers.

Product list

References

External links
 
 

Hentai companies
Video game publishers